Grailey Hewett "Grady" Higginbotham (December 31, 1892 – February 10, 1989) was an American football and baseball player, coach of football, basketball, and baseball, and college athletics administrator. Commonly known as Grady, he was also nicknamed "Big Hig".

Biography
Higginbotham was the first head coach of the Texas Tech Red Raiders men's basketball team, leading it to a 14–18 record from 1925 to 1927.  Higginbotham coached the Red Raiders baseball team to a 10–17 record from 1928 to 1929.  He was also the head coach of the Texas Tech Red Raiders football team in 1929, tallying a mark of 1–7–2.  He was the athletic director at Texas Tech from 1927 to 1929.  Higginbotham played college football and college baseball at Texas A&M University.  After graduating, he played in minor league baseball for several years.  He was the older brother of Roswell G. Higginbotham, who also played at Texas A&M and became a college baseball coach.

Head coaching record

Football

Basketball

Baseball

References

External links
 
 

1892 births
1989 deaths
American men's basketball coaches
Basketball coaches from Texas
American football fullbacks
Daniel Baker Hillbillies football coaches
Denison Blue Sox players
Denison Railroaders players
Dubuque Dubs players
Minor league baseball managers
Sherman Lions players
Texas A&M Aggies baseball players
Texas A&M Aggies football players
Texas Tech Red Raiders athletic directors
Texas Tech Red Raiders baseball coaches
Texas Tech Red Raiders basketball coaches
Texas Tech Red Raiders football coaches
Players of American football from Texas
All-Southern college football players